St Cuthbert's Well, known locally as Cuddy's Well, is an ancient holy well in the village of Bellingham, adjacent to St Cuthbert's Church, an eleventh-century church associated with the cult of the seventh century monk, bishop and hermit St Cuthbert. 

Three miracles at Bellingham, connected with the mediaeval cult of St Cuthbert, are recorded in the twelfth century Libellus of Reginald of Durham. They concern  Sproich, a poor but pious man employed as a bridge-builder by the Almoner of Durham.In the first miracle, after Sproich's daughter Eda stays away from church to sew a dress on the feast day of St Lawrence, her left hand becomes paralysed, clutching the dress. She is miraculously cured by an apparition of St Cuthbert after drinking water from the well. In the second, on the occasion of Eda's marriage, Sproich's cow is seized in payment by a bailiff of the local lord and placed with another tenant. whose house is later struck by lightning. The cow is miraculously spared. In the third, a thief called Walter  of Flanders and his accomplice, who have stolen Sproich's axe, are fatally attacked by the head and the handle of the axe.

The well, in a lane next to St Cuthbert's Church, is now directed through a Georgian conduit, known locally as a pant. The water is still used for baptisms. According to local tradition St Cuthbert originally discovered the source of the well.

Notes

References

, definition of pant
, "A Norwegian in Durham: Anatomy of a Miracle in Reginald of Durham's Libellus de admirandis beati Cuthberti" by H. Antonsson, S. Crumplin and A. Conti (for a summary of the three miracles)
 (for a paraphrase of the first miracle from Reginald of Durham's Libellus)

 (for a discussion of the role of Reginald of Durham's Libellus in the cult of St Cuthbert)

External links

St Cuthbert's Well
Heritage Centre Bellingham
St Cuthbert's Well, Listed buildings in Britain
St Cuthbert's Church, Bellingham
Healing water of Cuddy’s Well performed miracle, Hexham Courant, November 2008.

History of Northumberland
Grade II listed buildings in Northumberland
Cuthbert
Christian holy places
Bellingham, Northumberland